Supporting Party Mountain is a  tall mountain, located  east of Mount Fridovich in the Harold Byrd Mountains. Discovered in December 1929 by members of the Byrd Antarctic Expedition Geological Sledging Party under Laurence Gould, and named by them in appreciation of the splendid cooperative work of their Supporting Party. The mountain was climbed by members of Gould's party who took panoramic photographs from the summit.

Mountains of Marie Byrd Land